Willesee may refer to:

 Bill Willesee (1911–2000), Australian politician
 Don Willesee (1916-2003), Australian politician
 Michael Willesee, Jr., Australian television journalist
 Mike Willesee (1942-2019), Australian television journalist
 Terry Willesee, Australian television presenter